Suany Abigail Fajardo Bustamante (born 24 February 1994) is an Ecuadorian footballer who plays as a defender for CD El Nacional and the Ecuador women's national team.

International career
Fajardo capped for Ecuador at senior level during the 2018 Copa América Femenina.

International goals
Scores and results list Ecuador's goal tally first

References

1994 births
Living people
Sportspeople from Guayaquil
Ecuadorian women's footballers
Women's association football defenders
C.D. Cuenca Femenino players
C.D. El Nacional Femenino players
Ecuador women's international footballers
21st-century Ecuadorian women